Portesham was a small railway station serving the village of Portesham in the west of the English county of Dorset.

Location
The station was sited across the fields from  village not far from an underbridge carrying the line across the Weymouth to Abbotsbury road at a skew angle. Just to the east of the station an incline provided access to quarries near the Hardy Monument.

History

The station had a single platform and a passing loop. The goods shed was opposite the platform and functioned for the life of the branch. The station was the site of a GWR camp coach from 1935 to 1939.

The station closed with the branch on 1 December 1952.

Buildings
A typical William Clarke stone building served the single platform,

The site today
The station building is now part of a private dwelling and is used as a holiday let.

References

Bibliography

Further reading

External links
 Station on navigable O.S. map

Disused railway stations in Dorset
Former Great Western Railway stations
Railway stations in Great Britain opened in 1885
Railway stations in Great Britain closed in 1952